Alexei "Alex" Severinsky is a Soviet emigre living in the United States. He graduated from the Kharkiv University of Radioelectronics in 1967 and got his Candidate of Science degree (Ph.D.) in Electrical Engineering from Institute for Precision Measurements in Radioelectronics and Physics in Moscow in 1975. Before the emigration he worked in Kharkiv, Ukraine. Severinsky emigrated from the Soviet Union to the United States in 1978.

Severinsky is the inventor of the Hyperdrive power-amplified internal combustion engine power train. He patented this invention in 1994. The system is used in hybrid cars, in particular in the Toyota Prius. On August 16, 2006, a U.S. federal judge required Toyota to pay Alex Severinsky $25 for every Prius II, Highlander Hybrid and Lexus RX400h hybrid sold in the United States. On 21 July 2010 Severinsky and Toyota agreed on a settlement.

Severinsky is also the inventor of the Fuelcor technology - a patented technology for recycling carbon monoxide and carbon dioxide emissions into usable fuel products.  Fuelcor's technology is marketed by Fuelcor International, LLC, a Virginia-based company.

References 

Soviet emigrants to the United States
American inventors
Living people
Year of birth missing (living people)